Still Blazin is reggae, dancehall artist Capleton's eighth studio album.
It was released on February 26, 2002. The album is a mix of dancehall and reggae.

Track listing

2002 albums
Capleton albums